Following on from the good form at the end of the previous season, this new campaign started well with two league wins and progress through the preliminary round of the Swansea Valley Cup over Vardre 11-9 and over Treorchy 22-17 in the First Round of the Welsh Cup before the end of September. The Treorchy game was all the more rewarding, they being a Division Two East side experiencing a slide from the top flight – Simon Chatham scored a try from the wing and new Captain and outside half Damian James a try and four penalties.

Problems and some bad luck then returned with only two league wins in the next sixteen games. The Welsh Cup Second Round tie versus Maesteg was scratched and exit from the Swansea Valley Cup was inflicted by Abercrave 7-17. Keeping up something of a habit, the last two games of the season were victories over the only teams below us, ensuring we again remained in Division Three. The first of these crucial fixtures was at home to Glynneath.

An inspiring 57-17 was achieved by fast flowing rugby all over the field. Christian Roets, David Hawkins and Simon Donovan scored two tries each. Phillip Thomas, John Williams and Peter Abraham one try each, Gareth James kicked 6 conversions. Three days later Ystalyfera beat Ammanford 38-26 at Ynysydarren, Christian Roets scored a try, Damian James a try and four conversions, and Alun Guerrier four tries – a record in a single game by a forward.

Damian James scored 202 points this season, Christian Roets getting 9 tries. Christian was also voted Players Player of the year whilst Arwel Williams was Supporters favourite.

National League Division 3 South West

Ystalyfera 2004/05 Season Results

Ystalyfera 2004/05 Season Player Stats

References

Sport in Neath Port Talbot